John Chetwynd (1643 – 9 December 1702), of Rudge, near Sandon, Staffordshire was an English Member of Parliament.

He was the eldest son of John Chetwynd of Rudge.

He was Member of Parliament for Stafford from 1689 to 1695, and again in 1701 and 1702.  In the intervening period he sat for Tamworth in 1698–1700. He was pricked High Sheriff of Staffordshire for 1695–96.

He died in 1702. He had married, by 1678, Lucy, the daughter of Robert Roane of Tullesworth, Chaldon, Surrey and had 3 sons and a daughter.

His son Walter inherited the Ingestre estate from his distant cousin Walter Chetwynd the antiquary in 1693, greatly raising the prominence of his branch of the family. Walter was created Viscount Chetwynd in 1717, a title to which John's other two sons (John and William) succeeded in turn.

His daughter Lucy married Edward Younge, Bath King of Arms.

References

1643 births
1702 deaths
People from the Borough of Stafford
Members of the Parliament of England (pre-1707) for Stafford
English MPs 1689–1690
English MPs 1690–1695
English MPs 1698–1700
English MPs 1701
English MPs 1701–1702
High Sheriffs of Staffordshire